Raydel is a masculine given name. Notable people with the name include:

Raydel Corrales (born 1982), Cuban volleyball player
Raydel Hierrezuelo (born 1987), Cuban volleyball player

Masculine given names